The 1998 Legg Mason Tennis Classic was a men's tennis tournament played on outdoor hard courts in Washington, D.C., United States, that was part of the International Series Gold of the 1998 ATP Tour. It was the twenty-ninth edition of the tournament and was held 20 July – 26 July.

Seeds
Champion seeds are indicated in bold text while text in italics indicates the round in which those seeds were eliminated.

Draw

Finals

Top half

Section 1

Section 2

Bottom half

Section 3

Section 4

References

Singles